"Victim of Ritual'" is the first single from Tarja Turunen's fourth studio album Colours In The Dark. The single was released on July 12, 2013 as a limited edition cd (3000 copies), vinyl (1500 copies) The song was inspired by the one-movement orchestral piece "Boléro", by Maurice Ravel.

Music video
The video was shot in Berlin, Germany. and was released on 10 July. A  was released on 26 June.

Synopsis
The music video takes place in a huge factory in a bleak, dark world and focuses on three individuals working there. An oboist who is forced to play just one short musical sequence, an artist who can only paint canvas completely black, and a young man who is an aspiring dancer, but is forced to stand still. As Tarja stalks the factory, she throws a different colour at each person, and this shows them a better side of life. The oboist plays more complex sequences, the artist paints colourful and abstract designs, and the dancer starts to dance more energetically. Throughout the course of the video, Tarja is seen being chased by three masked, hooded figures who try to steal her colours. They try to make the lightening world dark again by throwing black powder, and knock out Tarja, but the three people from the factory fight back with the colours Tarja gifted them. As they smear the powder on their faces, they are shown to be invincible to the hooded gang's black powder, and eventually defeat them. Later, all wearing white instead of black previously, the three workers comfort a comatose Tarja. As they rub colours onto her skin, she opens her eyes. The video ends with a glimpse of the brighter life the people now live.

Track listing

References

External links
 Victim of Ritual  on www.tarja-coloursinthedark.com

  speaks about Victim of Ritual

2013 singles
Tarja Turunen songs
Songs written by Tarja Turunen
Songs written by Anders Wollbeck
Songs written by Mattias Lindblom
2013 songs